Gordon Bennett Bowdell III (born October 9, 1948) is a former American football wide receiver in the National Football League (NFL) who played for the Denver Broncos. He played college football at Michigan State University.

References 

1948 births
Living people
Players of American football from Detroit
American football wide receivers
Michigan State Spartans football players
Denver Broncos players